Frostburn is a supplemental book to the Dungeons and Dragons game.

Frostburn may also refer to:
 Frost burn, frostbite
 Frostburn (Regional Burn), a regional Burning Man event in West Virginia
 Frostburn Studios, a video game developer